|}

The Cammidge Trophy is a Listed flat horse race in Great Britain open to horses aged three years or older. It is run at Doncaster Racecourse over a distance of 6 furlongs and 2 yards (1,209 metres), and it is scheduled to take place each year in late March or early April. It is currently held on the opening day of the British flat racing turf season, at the same race meeting as the Lincoln Handicap.

Winners since 1988

See also 
Horse racing in Great Britain
List of British flat horse races

References 

 Paris-Turf:
Racing Post

Flat races in Great Britain
Doncaster Racecourse
Open sprint category horse races